Pooja Kiven Aa is a 2013 Punjabi comedy film directed by Nidhi Sharma and produced by Romi Tahli. The film stars Miss Pooja, Tarun Khanna, Sahil Vedoliyaa and Raj Jhinger

Plot
Pooja is a non-resident Indian from the UK. She visits Mumbai to sell her estate; she owns a very large bungalow.

When Bhinder, Deep and Jeet head to Mumbai in search of work, they meet Pooja, who employs them as cooks, trainers and cleaners. The trio fall in love with Pooja at first sight. Later on, Jeet and Bhinder lose interest in each other. Pooja's uncle (B.N. Sharma) tries to cheat her out of her property.

Crew

Production
Shooting began on 22 October 2012 and wrapped on 23 November 2012. The major locations were in Chandigarh, Goa and Mumbai, India. The film was shot with an Arriflex digital camera. Ahuja produced eight tracks with singers Miss Pooja, Mika Singh, Jelly, Rickie Rix (Miss Pooja's brother) and Master Saleem. Photographer Feroz Khan and Manjot (Late Night Studios) were involved with publicity.

Reception
The film received poor critical reception. "The movie is the definition of chaos," said Punjabi Media. Ballewood.in praised Pooja and made positive comments about performances, especially those by Tarun Khanna and Sahil Vedoliyaa, but found the movie's plot and screenplay disappointing: "This film provides an ample scope for criticism;  however, there were some good performances. Some good music would probably have saved the movie from falling flat at the box office."

Soundtrack

References

External links 
 
 
 
 

Punjabi-language Indian films
2010s Punjabi-language films
Films scored by Sachin Ahuja
2013 films